Yugoslavia was the host nation of the Eurovision Song Contest 1990, held in Zagreb, SR Croatia, Yugoslavia. It was represented by Tajči and the song "Hajde da ludujemo"

Before Eurovision

Jugovizija 1990 
The Yugoslav national final to select their entry, Jugovizija 1990, was held on 3 March 1990 in Zadar, Croatia, and was hosted by Ana Brbora Hum and Branko Uvodić.

Sixteen songs made it to the national final, which was broadcast by JRT to all of the regions of Yugoslavia. The winner was decided by the votes of eight regional juries (Sarajevo, Zagreb, Skopje, Titograd, Belgrade, Ljubljana, Priština and Novi Sad). The winning entry was "Hajde da ludujemo", performed by Croatian singer Tajči.

Jury members
 TVSk, Skopje: Gordana Kunovska (chairperson), Ljubomir Branđolica, Suzana Stefanovska, Meto Jovanovski
 TVPr, Prishtina: Mustafë Halili, Sonja Spasić, Valton Beqiri
 TVBg, Belgrade: Dragana Marković (chairperson), Rade Radivojević, Đorđe Marjanović, Branislav Karaulić
 TVZg, Zagreb: Doris Vrandečić (chairperson), Josip Klima, Ksenija Pajić, Miljenko Prohaska 
 TVSa, Sarajevo: Sanja Damić (chairperson), Dino Merlin (introduced as Dino Dervišhalidović) , Brano Likić, Zdravko Radulović
 TVLj, Ljubljana: Miša Molk (chairperson), Bojan Adamič, Dragan Bulič, Mirjam Korbar
 TVNS, Novi Sad: Boško Negovanović (chairperson), Branislav Krstić, Siniša Mihajlović, Josip Lorbek
 TVTg, Titograd: Zvezdana Tomović (chairperson), Marko Klepić, Vasilisa Radojević, Dejan Perišić

At Eurovision 
On the night of the contest Yugoslavia performed 15th in the running order, following France and preceding Portugal. At the close of voting, "Hajde da ludujemo" had picked up 81 points, placing Yugoslavia in 7th place out of 22 entries. The Yugoslav jury awarded its 12 points to runner-up France.

Voting

Notes

References

1990
Countries in the Eurovision Song Contest 1990
Eurovision